The Museum of American Heritage (MOAH) is a museum in Palo Alto, California. It is dedicated to the preservation and display of electrical and mechanical technology and inventions from the 1750s through the 1950s. The museum has a large collection of artifacts that are generally not accessible to the public. Selections from the collection are displayed in a historic house at 351 Homer Ave, Palo Alto, California. MOAH is a 501 (c) (3) non profit organization and a member of the American Alliance of Museums.

History 
The Museum of American Heritage was originally opened to the public on September 20, 1990. Prior to that it was the private collection of Frank Livermore (1919-2000). The museum was originally located at 275 Alma St., Palo Alto (9/1990 through 11/1994). From 1995 through 1998 the museum occupied a former BMW dealership at 3401 El Camino Real in Palo Alto. The current location on Homer Ave., in Palo Alto, was opened to the public in 1998.

At the time of his death, the Livermore Collection of consisted of approximately 1,000 artifacts. A trust was established by Frank Livermore to preserve and display this collection to the public. As of 2021, the MOAH collection has over 8,000 accessioned artifacts.

Exhibits 
Five rooms contain rotating exhibits that change several times per year. Exhibits contain artifacts selected from the museum collection and/or from local collectors. Prior exhibits include:
Frank's Cabinet of Curiosities: Celebrating 30 Years (March 2020 - August 8, 2021)
Cointraptions: Classic Coin-Operated Machines (September 20, 2019 - February 16, 2020)
The Happy Homemaker: History of Household Appliances (March 22, 2019 - August 18, 2019)
Vintage Toys: It's Child's Play! (September 28, 2018 - February 17, 2019)
In the Groove: A History of Record Players (March 23, 2018 - August 19, 2018)
Thomas Edison and His Rivals: Bringing Electricity to America (Fall 2017: September 22, 2017 - February 18, 2018)
Open for Business: Office Success Before Computers (March 24, 2017 to August 20, 2017)
The Evolution of Film (September 2016 - February 2017)
Pinball! An Exhibition of Vintage Pinball Machines (February 19, 2016 - August 21, 2016)
25 Years of the Museum of American Heritage: A Retrospective (April 2015 - January 2016)
Museum of American Heritage A to Z (October 2015 - March 2015)
Time Machines: Clocks & Timekeeping (April 2014 to September 2014)
Television, A History (Fall, 2013) 
Inventing the 20th Century (Summer, 2012)
Antique Toys, 1870-1930 (Winter, 2010)

Permanent exhibits in six rooms of the Williams House include:
An early 20th Century Kitchen
A 1920s General Store displaying the contents from a single Chicago store
Functioning Print Shop with 4 letterpress printers and one Intertype printer (Intertype Corporation)
Early Automobile Garage and Workshop

Collection 

The museum has a mission to collect and preserve artifacts, electrical and mechanical in nature, that were invented or built from the 1750s through to the end of the 1950s. The museum accepts donated artifacts that meet these criteria for inclusion in the collection.

The MOAH collection is housed in a remote warehouse and is seldom open to the public. Categories typical to the collection include: sewing machines, mechanical typewriters, cameras, radios and televisions, clocks, toys, adding machines and mechanical calculators, and kitchen appliances. There are over 8,000 accessioned artifacts in the collection and many more that are display items, extras, or permanent loan items. It is reported to be one of the largest collections of its kind in the United States.

Items from the collection are used for MOAH permanent and rotating exhibits. Other museums and institutions are able to borrow items from the MOAH collection for their exhibits or other displays. Organizations that have borrowed exhibit materials from MOAH include the San Francisco International Airport museum, the Los Altos History Museum, San Jose State University theater department, and the Stanford Federal Credit union.

The museum collection database is currently only accessible during public hours at the main museum location in Palo Alto.

House 
The Museum of American Heritage is currently open to the public in the Williams House on Homer Ave. in Palo Alto. This house was custom built in 1907 by Dr. Thomas Williams for his residence and private medical practice. Dr. Williams is noted for having opened the first doctor's office in the Palo Alto area.
The house is a Tudor Revival design, and the architect was Ernest Coxhead. The house was owned by the Williams family until the death of the last living daughter of Thomas and Dora Williams, Rhona Williams. The house was bequeathed to the city of Palo Alto to be used for the community benefit.

In 1997, Palo Alto asked for request for proposals of how to use the property. The city selected the Museum of American Heritage proposal, and after a significant restoration the museum opened its doors to public in 1998.
Significant features of the Williams house include:
Two story portion for the family living quarters with extensive built in cabinetry (the upstairs is currently not open to the general public)
Single story section designed specifically for Dr. Williams medical practice including an operating room with a large skylight for illumination
A large detached garage which housed one of the first automobiles in Palo Alto (this building was substantially altered during the 1997 restoration).

The Williams house is currently on the Palo Alto Historic Inventories list as a Category II on the Palo Alto Historic Building Inventory.
The building behind the main house (named the "Livermore Learning Center") is a new structure and is located where a small family orchard was originally located.

The Williams House Gardens 

Early photographs of the Williams' property show an open vista with an unobstructed view of the house, the beginnings of landscape, and only a few native trees. But Dora Williams' interest and proficiency in gardening developed along with her garden until it reached a height of complexity in the 1920s and 1930s. Her extensive notes on the garden document the garden development over the years, and have allowed the garden to be restored to its original state.

Unlike many public specimen gardens, this garden was (and remains) representative of an early 20th Century residential landscape. Featuring "outdoor rooms" delineated by rock walls and border plantings and punctuated by ornamental fountains and ponds.

At the same time the garden area served the more utilitarian functions required by the Williams family, such as a vegetable garden, a medicinal plants garden, clothes drying, and composting. It is attributed to be the only historically preserved landscape in Palo Alto, and one of the few in California. The Museum of American Heritage is currently preserving the Williams House Garden.

See also 
Silicon Valley Museums, for a listing of nearby museums and art galleries

References

External links 

 Museum of American Heritage - official site
 MOAH Facebook page

1990 establishments in California
Buildings and structures in Palo Alto, California
Historic house museums in California
History museums in California
Houses in Palo Alto, California
Museums in Santa Clara County, California
Technology museums in California
Tourist attractions in Silicon Valley